Theater im Pumpenhaus  is a theatre in Munster, North Rhine-Westphalia, Germany.

Theatres in North Rhine-Westphalia